Martignana di Po is a comune (municipality) in the Province of Cremona in the Italian region Lombardy, located about  southeast of Milan and about  southeast of Cremona.

Martignana di Po borders the following municipalities: Casalmaggiore, Casteldidone, Colorno, Gussola, San Giovanni in Croce, Sissa Trecasali.

References

Cities and towns in Lombardy